Jay R. Traver (1894–1974) was a University of Massachusetts entomologist. Jeffrey Lockwood wrote in The Infested Mind: Why Humans Fear, Loathe, and Love Insects that she was responsible for "one of the most remarkable mistakes ever published in a scientific entomological journal".

Proceedings of the Entomological Society of Washington 
Traver displayed evidence in her writing of having what has been described as a classic case of delusional parasitosis – a mental disorder in which individuals believe, without evidence, that they have a parasitic infestation of the skin. After she was "rebuffed by doctors for years" when describing her symptoms, she embarked on a quest to identify the source of what she believed was an infestation causing her skin sores.  A dermatologist said her symptoms "were largely imaginary" or  "caused by an ill-advise (sic) attempt [at self-medication by the patient]". She convinced a neurologist that she did not need his help. She corresponded with others who reported similar symptoms, and used 22 different chemicals to attempt to rid herself of the infestation.

She claimed the cause of her infestation to be a rare dust mite that she thought came from a neighbor's cat or dog. In 1951, she published in the Proceedings of the Entomological Society of Washington a paper titled "Unusual Scalp Dermatitis in Humans Caused by the Mite, Dermatophagoides (Acarina, epidermoptidae)" summarizing her tribulations and findings. The article concluded with a "tirade against the 'medical profession' and her pride in rejecting the dermatologist’s verdict and having the knowledge to identify her invaders", according to Matan Shelomi.

In the mid-1960s, another scientist, Alex Fain, discovered that Travers' account was a scientific impossibility, because dust mites do not burrow into human skin as Traver described; other inconsistencies are documented in the literature and described by Shelomi. Hinkle, Poorbaugh, Shelomi and others argue that the evidence that Traver had delusional parasitosis is contained in her detailed 1951 publication describing her symptoms. Lockwood concludes in The Infested Mind: Why Humans Fear, Loathe, and Love Insects that "Traver's account was a vivid, poignant, and tragic autobiography of a woman driven to desperate measures to affirm the reality of her delusion". 

In the 2013 article, "Mad Scientist: A Unique Case of a Published Delusion", Shelomi describes Traver as having a "textbook case" of delusional parasitosis.  Shelomi argues that the paper published by Traver "is unique in the scientific literature in that its conclusions may be based on data that was unconsciously fabricated by the author's mind". Shelomi argues that the published work may have been accepted on the basis of her reputation as a scientist, although the writing was not the dispassionate writing typical of a scientist, and that it should not have been accepted for publication. He says the paper warrants retraction, but that doing so could raise concerns about discrimination against those with mental disorders, and questions the responsibility of medical journals when delusions are presented as science. He argues that the historical paper should be retracted because it has misled people about their delusions. He says the paper has done "permanent and lasting damage" to people with delusional parasitosis, "who widely circulate and cite articles such as Traver's and other pseudoscientific or false reports" via the internet, making treatment and cure more difficult. He compares it to the controversy with Andrew Wakefield's retracted paper that fueled the Lancet MMR vaccine autism fraud.

Works 
Traver collaborated with James George Needham on his 1935 book, The Biology of Mayflies, which was described in 2007 as "the cornerstone of North American mayfly entomology".

See also 
 Morgellons

References

American entomologists
1894 births
1974 deaths
20th-century American zoologists
Academic scandals
Delusional disorders
Medical controversies in the United States
People involved in scientific misconduct incidents
Delusional parasitosis